Ammakkoru Tharattu  is a 2015 Indian Malayalam film written and directed by Sreekumaran Thampi. It stars Sharada, Madhu, Suraj Venjarammoodu, Manju Pillai, Bindu Panicker, Manikandan Pattambi, Sai Kumar, P. Sreekumar, Indrans, Mamukkoya in the lead roles.

Cast

Sharada
Madhu 
Suraj Venjarammoodu
Lakshmi Gopalaswamy
Indrans
Manikandan Pattambi
Sai Kumar 
P.Sreekumar
Bindu Panicker 
Mamukkoya 
Manju Pillai
Niyas Backer

Soundtrack
The songs are written and composed by Sreekumaran Thampi himself.

References

External links

2010s Malayalam-language films
2015 films
Films directed by Sreekumaran Thampi